A Franco-Hungarian alliance was formed in October 1528 between King Francis I of France and King John Zápolya of Hungary.

Background
France had already been looking for allies in Central Europe. Its ambassador, Antonio Rincon, was sent on several missions to Poland and Hungary between 1522 and 1525. Since the 1522 Battle of Bicocca, Francis has wanted to ally with King Sigismund I the Old of Poland. 

In 1524, a Franco-Polish alliance was signed between Francis and Sigismund, but the agreement fell through after Francis was vanquished by Charles V at the Battle of Pavia in 1525.

Alliance with Hungary
In 1526, Francis I again started to look for allies in Central Europe, this time by turning his attention to Hungary. In 1528, John Zápolya was very vulnerable since he had been defeated by Ferdinand of Austria, his rival claimant to the throne of Hungary, at the Battle of Tarcal in August 1527. Besides the French alliance, Zapolya chose to become a vassal to the Ottoman Empire in February 1528 through the negotiations of Jerome Laski. Rincon went to Istanbul to bring the document, which triggered the development of relations between France and the Ottoman Empire.

The treaty was signed in France in Fontainebleau and Paris on 23 and 28 October 1528. It was then ratified by Zapolya at Buda on 1 September 1529. In the treaty, Francis promised to help Zapolya financially and through other means. In exchange, Zapolya agreed to continue the fight against Ferdinand of Austria and to provide Hungarian troops to Francis in Italy.

In the Little War in Hungary, France fought side by side with Zápolya and Suleiman the Magnificent against the Habsburgs. A French artillery unit was dispatched to the war in Hungary in 1543–1544 and was attached to the Ottoman Army.

See also
Foreign alliances of France
Franco-Ottoman alliance

Notes

References

 Garnier, Edith L'Alliance Impie Editions du Felin, 2008, Paris  Interview

16th-century military alliances
Treaties of the Kingdom of France
Treaties of the Kingdom of Hungary (1000–1918)
Military alliances involving France
Military alliances involving Hungary
France–Hungary relations
Francis I of France
1528 treaties
France–Hungary military relations